Myrmica sulcinodis is a species of ant belonging to the family Formicidae.

It is native to Europe and Northern America.

References

Myrmicinae
Insects described in 1846